Randles is an unincorporated community in Cape Girardeau County, in the U.S. state of Missouri.

History
A post office called Randles was established in 1891, and remained in operation until 1957. The community has the name of the local Randles family.

References

Unincorporated communities in Cape Girardeau County, Missouri
Unincorporated communities in Missouri